Mats Jürgen Grambusch (born 4 November 1992) is a German field hockey player who plays as a midfielder or forward for Rot-Weiss Köln and the Germany national team.

He was educated at Seaford College.

Career
Grambusch has played for the national team since 2011. He represented his country at the 2016 Summer Olympics, where he won the bronze medal.

References

External links

1992 births
Living people
People educated at Seaford College
Sportspeople from Mönchengladbach
German male field hockey players
Male field hockey midfielders
Male field hockey forwards
2014 Men's Hockey World Cup players
Field hockey players at the 2016 Summer Olympics
Field hockey players at the 2020 Summer Olympics
2018 Men's Hockey World Cup players
Olympic field hockey players of Germany
Olympic bronze medalists for Germany
Olympic medalists in field hockey
Medalists at the 2016 Summer Olympics
East Grinstead Hockey Club players
Rot-Weiss Köln players
Men's England Hockey League players
Expatriate field hockey players
German expatriate sportspeople in England
2018 FIH Indoor Hockey World Cup players
2023 Men's FIH Hockey World Cup players